Grandison’s forest skink (Sphenomorphus grandisonae)  is a species of skink found in Thailand.

References

grandisonae
Reptiles described in 1962
Taxa named by Edward Harrison Taylor
Reptiles of Thailand